Shelby Steele (born January 1, 1946) is an author, columnist, documentary film maker, and a Robert J. and Marion E. Oster Senior Fellow at Stanford University's Hoover Institution. He specializes in the study of race relations, multiculturalism, and affirmative action.

In 1990, he received the National Book Critics Circle Award in the general nonfiction category for his book The Content of Our Character. In 2004, Steele was awarded the National Medal of the Humanities.

Early life and education
Steele was born in Phoenix, Illinois, a Cook County village off Chicago's South Side, to a black father and a white mother. His father, Shelby Sr., a truck driver with a third-grade education, and his mother, Ruth, a social worker, were founding members of the Congress of Racial Equality (CORE). Steele attended an all-black elementary school. His paternal grandfather was born a slave in Kentucky. His twin brother is Claude Steele, a professor emeritus of psychology at Stanford University, who held leadership positions with UC Berkeley, Columbia University and Stanford.

Steele received a B.A. in political science from Coe College, an M.A. in sociology from Southern Illinois University Edwardsville, and a Ph.D. in English from the University of Utah. Steele met his wife, Rita Silverman, while they were students at Coe. Steele was active in the SCOPE Project, a voter registration project of the Southern Christian Leadership Conference (SCLC), and he met Rita at an activist meeting.

Steele spent 20 years as an English professor at San Jose State University.

Career
Steele has been called a black conservative. He opposes policies such as affirmative action, which he considers to be unsuccessful liberal campaigns to promote equal opportunity for African Americans. He contends that blacks have been "twice betrayed:" first by slavery and oppression and then by group preferences mandated by the government, which discourage self-agency and personal responsibility in blacks.

Steele believes that the use of victimization is the greatest hindrance for black Americans. In his view, white Americans see blacks as victims to ease their guilty conscience, and blacks attempt to turn their status as victims into a kind of currency that will purchase nothing of real or lasting value. Therefore, he claims, blacks must stop "buying into this zero-sum game" by adopting a "culture of excellence and achievement" without relying on "set-asides and entitlements."

Barack Obama

Steele wrote a short book, A Bound Man: Why We are Excited about Obama and Why He Can't Win, published in December 2007. The book contained Steele's analysis of Barack Obama's character as a child born to a mixed couple who then had to grow as a black man.  Steele concluded that Obama is a "bound man" to his "black identity." Steele gives this description of his conclusion:

After Obama won the 2008 U.S. presidential election, Steele defended the content of the book and claimed its subtitle was a marketing device motivated by the publisher which he came up with "in about 30 seconds." He explains Obama's victory by likening him to Louis Armstrong who donned the "bargainer's mask" in his bid for white acceptance. In his analysis, he takes whites, whom he claims have for decades been stigmatized as racist and had to prove they are not, "off the hook."

On Uncommon Knowledge, an interview program for the Hoover Institute hosted by Peter Robinson, he said: "White America has made tremendous moral progress since the '60s.... And they've never given themselves credit for that. And here is an opportunity at last to document this progress."

On Israel
Steele has been critical of what he describes as the "world opinion" of Israel.

What Killed Michael Brown? 
What Killed Michael Brown? is a documentary film written and narrated by Shelby Steele and directed by his filmmaker son, Eli Steele, which was scheduled to premiere on October 16, 2020. It addresses race relations in the United States and in particular an incident in Ferguson, Missouri, in 2014 involving Michael Brown. Steele has opined that there is "poetic truth" concerning the death of Michael Brown. Steele said: "The language—he was 'executed,' he was 'assassinated,' 'hands up, don’t shoot'—it was a stunning example of poetic truth, of the lies that a society can entertain in pursuit of power." Steele additionally said: "In a microcosm, that’s where race relations are today. The truth has no chance. It's smothered by the politics of victimization." Amazon initially rejected it for its Amazon Prime Video streaming service but later relented after coming under fire from op-eds in The Wall Street Journal and other publications.

Bibliography

Books

Documentary films

Awards
 National Book Critics Circle Award (1990) in the general non-fiction category for the book The Content of Our Character.
 Emmy and Writers Guild Awards for his 1991 Frontline documentary film Seven Days in Bensonhurst.

See also
 Black conservatism in the United States

References

External links

 
 

1946 births
Living people
African-American social scientists
American columnists
American documentary filmmakers
American political writers
American male non-fiction writers
American social sciences writers
American sociologists
Coe College alumni
National Humanities Medal recipients
Writers from Chicago
San Jose State University faculty
Southern Illinois University alumni
Southern Illinois University Edwardsville alumni
American twins
University of Utah alumni
21st-century African-American people
20th-century African-American people